Monterosso Calabro is a comune (municipality) in the Province of Vibo Valentia in the Italian region of Calabria, located about  southwest of Catanzaro and about  northeast of Vibo Valentia.

Monterosso Calabro borders the following municipalities: Capistrano, Maierato, Polia.

Demographic evolution

References

Cities and towns in Calabria